Detling is a surname. Notable people with the surname include: 

John M. Detling (1880–1948), American politician, son of Valentine
Valentine Detling (1843–1920), American businessman and politician